Hermann Amborn is a German anthropologist and ethnologist. With a regional focus on northern and eastern Africa, Amborn's research addresses the political organisation of society, the division of labour, agricultural ethnology, and ethics in applied anthropological research.

Life and career
Amborn's father was a pastor who opposed the Nazi regime. As a young man, Amborn initially trained as a technical draftsman and engineer before changing fields. Amborn held visiting professorships in Hamburg and Berlin in addition to Kansas State University. He became a full professor at Ludwig-Maximilians-Universität München in 1987, where he was made professor emeritus on retirement in 1998. From 1991 to 2001, Amborn was the ethics working group spokesperson for the German Anthropological Association (formerly Deutsche Gesellschaft
für Völkerkunde, now: Deutsche Gesellschaft für Sozial- und
Kulturanthropologie).

Amborn has notably contributed to the study and discussion of African communities which self-govern outside of a statist framework through anti-hierarchical structures, without reliance on violent coercion in enforcing their rules and laws, and in line with anarchist principles. Mark Bray describes Amborn's work as "challenging the inevitability of the state as the "natural" outcome of societal evolution"

Selected works
 Die Bedeutung der Kulturen des Niltals für die Eisenproduktion im subsaharischen Afrika. (Dissertation) Studien zur Kulturkunde. Frobenius-Institut, Frankfurt 1976, 
 Differenzierung und Integration. Vergleichende  Untersuchungen  zu Spezialisten und Handwerkern in südäthiopischen Agrargesellschaften. (Habilitationsschrift) Trickster, München 1990
 Unbequeme Ethik. Überlegungen zu einer verantwortlichen Ethnologie. Reimer, Berlin 1993, 
 Flexibel aus Tradition / Burji in Äthiopien und Kenia: Unter Verwendung der Aufzeichnungen von Helmut Straube / With explanation of some cultural items in English. Harrassowitz, Wiesbaden 2009, 
 Das Recht als Hort der Anarchie. Gesellschaften ohne Herrschaft und Staat. Matthes & Seitz, Berlin 2016, . Materialien vom Autor dazu online
 'Concepts in Wood and Stone - Socio-religious Monuments of the Konso of Southern Ethiopia', Zeitschrift für Ethnologi, 2002.  
 Burji: Versatile by Tradition in Changing Identifications and Alliances in North-East Africa, Volume 1 edited by Günther Schlee and Elizabeth E. Watson. Berghahn Books, 2009.
 Mobility, Knowledge and Power: Craftsmen in the Borderland in Changing Identifications and Alliances in North-East Africa, Volume 1 edited by Günther Schlee and Elizabeth E. Watson. Berghahn Books, 2009.
 Law as Refuge of Anarchy: Societies without Hegemony or State. Untimely Meditations, MIT Press, Cambridge, MA, 2019.

Notes

1933 births
Living people
German anthropologists
German ethnologists
Scientists from Rhineland-Palatinate
Academic staff of the Ludwig Maximilian University of Munich